Ptyctini is a tribe of common barklice in the family Psocidae. There are about 6 genera and at least 20 described species in Ptyctini.

Genera
These six genera belong to the tribe Ptyctini:
 Camelopsocus Mockford, 1965 i c g b
 Indiopsocus Mockford, 1974 i c g b
 Loensia Enderlein, 1924 i c g b
 Ptycta Enderlein, 1925 i c g b
 Steleops Enderlein, 1910 i c g b
 Trichadenotecnum Enderlein, 1909 i c g b
Data sources: i = ITIS, c = Catalogue of Life, g = GBIF, b = Bugguide.net

References

Further reading

External links

 

Psocidae